William Ellerbe Pelham Jr. is an American clinical psychologist known for his research on ADHD. He is Distinguished University Professor and director of the Center for Children and Families at Florida International University. He was educated at Dartmouth College and the State University of New York at Stony Brook. He is a fellow of the American Psychological Association (APA) and the American Psychological Society, and he has served as president of the APA's Division 53 (the Society of Clinical Child and Adolescent Psychology) and the International Society for Research in Child and Adolescent Psychopathology.

Education and academic career
Pelham received his B.A. from Dartmouth College in 1970 and his Ph.D. in clinical psychology from the State University of New York at Stony Brook in 1976. Before joining the faculty of FIU in 2010, he taught at the State University of New York at Buffalo, where he ran a program and summer camp for children with ADHD for fourteen years. When he joined the faculty of FIU, he took the ADHD program with him. He also taught at Washington State University, Florida State University, and the University of Pittsburgh before joining FIU.

References

External links
Faculty page

Living people
American clinical psychologists
American child psychologists
Attention deficit hyperactivity disorder researchers
Fellows of the American Psychological Association
Fellows of the Association for Psychological Science
Dartmouth College alumni
Stony Brook University alumni
Florida International University faculty
University at Buffalo faculty
Year of birth missing (living people)